The Bhonsles of Nagpur were a Maratha royal house that ruled the Kingdom of Nagpur from 1739-1853. They hailed from the Bhonsle clan of Marathas and were one of the most important and powerful Maratha chiefs in the Maratha Empire.

Origin
The Bhonsale family were originally headmen from Deor or Deur under the forts Chandan Vandan (presently in Koregaon Taluka, District Satara and was under Deshmukhi rights of Bhoite Clan), a village in Satara district. Raghoji's grandfather and his two brothers had fought in the armies of Shivaji, and to the most distinguished of them was entrusted a high military command and the collection of chauth (tribute) in Berar.

Ascension to power
After Chand Sultan, the Gond raja of Nagpur's death in 1739, there were quarrels over the succession, leading to the throne being usurped by Wali Shah, an illegitimate son of Bakht Buland Shah. Chand Sultan's widow invoked the aid of the Maratha leader Raghuji Bhonsle of Berar in the interest of her sons Akbar Shah and Burhan Shah. Wali Shah was put to death and the rightful heirs placed on the throne. Raghoji I Bhonsle was sent back to Berar with a plentiful bounty for his aid. The Maratha general judged that Nagpur must be a plentiful and rich country by the magnificence of his reward.

However, dissensions continued between the brothers and once again, the elder brother Burhan Shah requested the aid of Raghuji Bhonsla. Akbar Shah was driven into exile and finally poisoned at Hyderabad. However this time, Ragoji Bhonsle did not have the heart to leave such a plentiful and rich country, with it being within his grasp. He declared himself 'protector' of the Gond king. Thus in 1743, Burhan Shah was practically made a state pensionary, with real power being in the hands of the Maratha ruler. After this event the history of the Gond kingdom of Deogarh is not recorded. A series of Maratha rulers came to power following the fall of the Gonds from the throne of Nagpur, starting with Raghoji Bhonsle.

History
The Bhonsles of Nagpur were near relations of Chhatrapati Shahu, who raised them to riches and power. Raghoji I Bhonsle overran Bengal & Bihar during the reign of Alivardi Khan, occupying Orissa from the Nawab. However, they did not play any part in the Third Battle of Panipat and First Anglo-Maratha War, so they gradually sank to a secondary position in the Maratha Confederacy. The reason for their half-hearted cooperation with the other Maratha chiefs was that they were bribed by Warren Hastings. They were generally opposed to the Peshwa, and claimed independent authority as they essentially controlled the Gond king of Nagpur.

Deposition
Raghuji Bhonsle III died without a male heir in 1853, and the kingdom was annexed by the British under the doctrine of lapse. The territories of the former kingdom was administered as Nagpur Province, under a commissioner appointed by the Governor-General of India, until the formation of the Central Provinces in 1861.

Rulers
 Raghoji I Bhonsle (173914Feb 1755)
 Janoji Bhonsle (175521 May 1772)
 Mudhoji Bhonsle (177219 May 1788)
 Raghoji II Bhonsle (178822Mar 1816)
 Parsoji Bhonsle (1816 2 Feb 1817) (b.1778d.1817)
 Mudhoji II Bhonsle "Appa Sahib" (181715Mar 1818) (b. 1796d.1840)
 Raghuji Bhonsle III (181811Dec 1853) (b.1808d.1853)

References

Maratha clans
Nagpur